The women’s 470 was a sailing event on the Sailing at the 2012 Summer Olympics program in Weymouth and Portland National Sailing Academy, in the 470 dinghy. Eleven races (last one a medal race) were scheduled and completed. 40 sailors, on 20 boats, from 20 nations competed. Ten boats qualified for the medal race on course area Nothe in front of Weymouth, where each position scored double points.

Schedule

Course areas and course configurations  

For the 470 course areas Portland, Nothe, West, and South were used. The location (50° 35.19’ N, 02° 26.54’ W) points to the center Portland course area, the location (50° 36.18’ N 02° 25.98’ W) points to the center of the Nothe course area, the location (50° 37.18’ N 02° 23.55’ W) points to the center of the West course area and the location (50° 35.71’ N 02° 22.08’ W) points to the center of the South course area. The target time for the course was 60 minutes for the races and 30 minutes for the medal race. The race management could choose from many course configurations.

Results

Daily standings

Further reading

References 

Women's 470
470 competitions
Olym
Women's events at the 2012 Summer Olympics